Ventrifossa saikaiensis is a species of rattail. This is a deep-water fish found at depths of up to 740 m. It is found in the waters off southern Japan and northern Taiwan.

This species reaches a length of up to 25 cm. It has a pointed snout, a large, inferior mouth with a dark margin on the upper lip and a long chin barbel. The first dorsal fin is entirely dark, lacking the contrasting patches seen in some members of the genus. There is a large bioluminescent organ located between the bases of the pelvic fins.

References

A new species, Caelorinchus sheni, and 19 new records of grenadiers (Pisces: Gadiformes: Macrouridae) from Taiwan - CHIOU Mei-Luen ; SHAO Kwang-Tsao ; IWAMOTO Tomio

Macrouridae
Fish described in 1984